The southern Idaho ground squirrel (Urocitellus endemicus)  is a species of the largest genus of ground squirrels. This species and the Northern Idaho ground squirrel were previously considered conspecific, together called the Idaho ground squirrel.

Description
The species has sexual dimorphism, with males being normally larger than females.

Behavior

The southern Idaho ground squirrel can be found in an area about  extending from Emmett, Idaho, northwest to Weiser, Idaho, and the surrounding area of Squaw Butte, Midvale Hill, and Henley Basin in Gem, Payette, and Washington counties.

Its range is bounded on the south by the Payette River, on the west by the Snake River and on the northeast by lava flows.

References

External links 
Digital Atlas of Idaho entry from Idaho State University
Southern Idaho ground squirrel species profile from the United States Fish and Wildlife Service

Urocitellus
Mammals of the United States
ground squirrel, southern Idaho
Mammals described in 1991